The Men's 1 km time trial was held on 18 October 2014.

Results

References

Men's 1 km time trial
European Track Championships – Men's 1 km time trial